Iris pseudacorus, the yellow flag, yellow iris, or water flag, is a species of flowering plant in the family Iridaceae.  It is native to Europe, western Asia and northwest Africa. Its specific epithet pseudacorus means "false acorus", referring to the similarity of its leaves to those of Acorus calamus (sweet flag), as they have a prominently veined mid-rib and sword-like shape. However, the two plants are not closely related. The flower is commonly attributed with the fleur-de-lis.

Description

I. pseudacorus grows best in very wet conditions, and is common in wetlands, where it tolerates submersion, low pH, and anoxic soils. The plant spreads quickly, by both rhizome and water-dispersed seed. It fills a similar niche to that of Typha and often grows with it, though usually in shallower water. While it is primarily an aquatic or marginal plant, the rhizomes can survive prolonged dry conditions.

Large I. pseudacorus stands in western Scotland form a very important feeding and breeding habitat for the endangered corncrake.

I. pseudacorus is one of two iris species native to the United Kingdom, the other being Iris foetidissima (stinking iris).

Both the petals and stem are toxic to animals and plants.

Nectar production
The plant was rated in second place for per day nectar production per flower in a UK plants survey conducted by the AgriLand project, which is supported by the UK Insect Pollinators Initiative. However, when number of flowers per floral unit, flower abundance, and phenology were taken into account, it dropped out of the top 10 for most nectar per unit cover per year, as did all plants that placed in the top ten, with the exception of common comfrey, Symphytum officinale.

Cultivation
It is widely planted in temperate regions as an ornamental plant, with several cultivars selected for bog garden planting. The following cultivars have gained the Royal Horticultural Society's Award of Garden Merit: 
 'Roy Davidson'  
'Variegata'  (it has leaves that are edged with deep white stripes )

Other cultivars known include; Alba (with pale cream flowers) and Golden Fleece (with dark yellow flowers).

It used to grow in the ditch of the fortified city of Mdina, on the island of Malta, where water was readily available, but since the renovation of the ditch it has since vanished from the area.

Invasive species
In some regions (including the USA and South Africa) where it is not native, it has escaped from cultivation to establish itself as an invasive aquatic plant which can create dense, monotypic stands, outcompeting other plants in the ecosystem. Where it is invasive, it is tough to remove on a large scale. Even ploughing the rhizomes is often ineffective. It has been banned in some areas but is still widely sold in others for use in gardens.

Iris pseudacorus is reported as invasive in Connecticut, Delaware, Maryland, New Hampshire, North Carolina, Oregon, Tennessee, Virginia, Vermont, Washington, Wisconsin, and West Virginia.

Toxicity and uses
The plant's roots and leaves are poisonous.

This plant has been used as a form of water treatment since it can take up macronutrients (such as nitrogen and phosphorus) through its roots, and is featured in many AS Level Biology practicals as its ability to grow in low pH levels makes it a useful indicator.

It can also withstand high salinity levels in the water.

Gallery

See also
Fleur-de-lis
Flag of the Brussels-Capital Region
Iris Sawfly

References

Flora Europaea: Iris pseudacorus

External links
Plants for a Future: Iris pseudacorus

pseudacorus
Flora of Europe
Flora of North Africa
Flora of Western Asia
Garden plants of Africa
Garden plants of Asia
Garden plants of Europe
Medicinal plants of Africa
Medicinal plants of Asia
Medicinal plants of Europe
Plants described in 1753
Taxa named by Carl Linnaeus